Željko Franulović (born 13 June 1947) is a Croatian former tennis player who competed for SFR Yugoslavia and has since had a long career in tennis management. He has been the Monte-Carlo Masters tournament director since 2005. 

Whilst his career-high ATP singles ranking was world No. 6, the ATP rankings were installed after his 1969–1971 heyday – Franulović was ranked inside the top 20 in both 1970 and 1971, reaching as high as world No. 8 in March 1971. Finalist of the 1970 French Open and winner in Monte Carlo the same year.

Biography
Franulović was born on the island of Korčula to father Ivo and mother Katica, but at the age of one month got brought to Split where he grew up. His playing career lasted for 12 years between 1969 and 1980, during which he won a total of ten singles professional titles as well as seven doubles titles.

He is remembered for reaching the French Open final in 1970, which he lost to Czech Jan Kodeš in straight sets. He reached the semifinals the following year. He also won the Monte-Carlo Masters in 1970.

Since retiring from playing tennis, Franulović became involved in the ATP since the 1990s. He was the coach of the Croatian Davis Cup Team from 1994 to 1997.
He was the Tournament Representative for Europe on the Association of Tennis Professionals' Board of Directors, between 2007 and 2009.

Grand Slam finals

Singles: 1 (1 runner-up)

Grand Prix Super Series finals

Singles: 3 (3 titles)

Grand Slam singles performance timeline

Note: The Australian Open was held twice in 1977, in January and December.

Orders
  Order of Saint-Charles Knight

References

External links
 
 
 

1947 births
Living people
Croatian male tennis players
Croatian tennis coaches
Tennis players from Split, Croatia
Yugoslav male tennis players